Blowout is an unincorporated community in Blanco County, Texas, United States.

History
This community dates back to 1854 when a group of two-dozen homesteaders moved to the area from Kentucky and settled on the east side of Comanche Creek near Comanche Spring, about three miles below the origin of the creek. It began to grow into a community as more settlers arrived and moved upstream. The origin of the name "Blowout" is reported to be due to a bat guano explosion, when ammonia and other gases built up inside the cave and lightning struck its mouth. The cave was named Blowout Cave and was located on the east side of the creek and was home to 1,000 bats. There is little trace of the community today, as only several scattered houses are located among the rocky hills.

In 1875, the community had several businesses. A post office was established at Blowout that year and remained in operation until 1918. It ran through Fredericksburg to Willow City to Blowout. Mail was also delivered from nearby Burnet. There was one brief interruption when the creeks and rivers flooded due to heavy rain and when the mail carrier was arrested for "abstracting money". Settlers sold wagon loads of bat guano for fertilizer and appeared to have ended briefly, until local rancher Frank Lacy discovered gold in a nearby creek in 1896, thus causing a gold rush in the community.

Geography

Education
Blowout is served by the Johnson City Independent School District.

Media
 KTSN-FM, a radio station (88.9 FM) licensed to serve Blowout.

References

Unincorporated communities in Blanco County, Texas
Unincorporated communities in Texas